A Whisper in the Dark is a 1976 Italian film directed by Marcello Aliprandi.

Production
A Whisper in the Dark was written by the husband and wife screenwriting team of Nicolò Rienzi and Maria Teresa Rienzi. The film was shot in Venice in early 1976. John Phillip Law who acted in the film, stated that the film was made due to the popularity of the film Don't Look Now.

Release
A Whisper in the Dark was distribute theatrically in Italy by Lia Film on 12 August 1976. It grossed a total of 171,391,126 Italian lire on its domestic release, which Italian film historian and author Roberto Curti described as "disappointing" and that the film "sunk at the box office".

Reception
Curti stated that the film earned "moderate critical praise" on its release. Tullio Kezich admired the bizarre fantastic atmosphere of the film, while it "exceeds in extravaganzas [...] where it would have taken discipline of choice"
 Giovanni Grazzini that with this film Aliprandi had "grown up" and despite lacking his own personality as a director he "runs the show".

References

Footnotes

Sources

External links
 

Italian horror films
Films shot in Venice
Italian mystery films
1970s Italian films